The Odontotremataceae are a family of fungi in the monotypic order of Odontotrematales. Species of this family have a widespread distribution, but are especially known from northern temperate areas.

The order of Odontotrematales was published by Robert Lücking in Crit. Rev. Pl. Sci. vol.38 (3) on page 233 in 2019.

Genera
Claviradulomyces  – 7 spp.
Coccomycetella  – 2 spp.
Odontotrema  – 2 spp.
Odontura  – 1 sp.
Parakarstenia  – 1 sp.
Paralethariicola  – 1 sp.
Potriphila  – 3 spp.
Rogellia  – 2 spp.
Sphaeropezia  – 22 spp.
Stromatothecia  – 1 spp.
Tryblis  – 2 spp.
Xerotrema  – 2 spp.

References

Ostropales
Lecanoromycetes families
Taxa described in 1982
Taxa named by David Leslie Hawksworth